Staff colleges (also command and staff colleges and War colleges) train military officers in the administrative, military staff and policy aspects of their profession. It is usual for such training to occur at several levels in a career. For example, an officer may be sent to various staff courses: as a captain they may be sent to a single service command and staff school to prepare for company command and equivalent staff posts; as a major to a single or joint service college to prepare for battalion command and equivalent staff posts; and as a colonel or brigadier to a higher staff college to prepare for brigade and division command and equivalent postings.

The success of staff colleges spawned, in the mid-twentieth century, a civilian imitation in what are called administrative staff colleges. These institutions apply some of the principles of the education of the military colleges to the executive development of managers from both the public and private sectors of the economy. The first and best-known administrative staff college was established in Britain at Greenlands near Henley, Oxfordshire and is now renamed Henley Management College.

History
The first modern staff college was that of Prussia.  Prussian advanced officer education began under the reign of Frederick the Great in 1710.  The Seven Years' War demonstrated the inadequacy of the education that generals had at that time, but it was not until 1801 that staff training in a modern sense began when Gerhard von Scharnhorst became the director of the Prussian Military Academy. Prussian defeats by Napoleon I led to the creation of the Allgemeine Kriegsschule (General War Academy) with a nine-month programme covering mathematics, tactics, strategy, staff work, weapons science, military geography, languages, physics, chemistry, and administration. The German staff courses have been used as a basic templates for other staff courses around the world.

Staff course formats

Nations have taken a wide variety of approaches to the form, curriculum and status of staff colleges, but have much in common with the Prussian courses of the early 19th Century. Some courses act as filters for promotion or entry into a specialist staff corps.  The length of courses varies widely, from three months to three years, with some having entrance and/or exit examinations. The more senior the course, the more likely that it will include strategic, political and joint aspects, with junior courses often focusing on single service and tactical military aspects of warfare.

Idiom
Certain terms of art or idiom have developed in staff colleges over time, and then been used in wider college or university settings and everyday usage, including:

 staff refers to the professional personnel (usually called directing staff (DS)) and employees of the college;
 fight the white, normally expressed as do not fight the white (as in do not go against the staff's pre-determined answer), where the 'white' is the question given to students, which may lack realism or not fit current operations. A "pink" is the Staff College's staff answer to a particular problem or issue. Pinks and whites referred to the color coding of course material where problems and information for use of students was printed on standard white sheets of papers while material intended for use by directing staff (which often contained suggested solutions/answers) was produced on pink sheets. This practice originates from staff colleges of British origins. The tradition survives across several Commonwealth staff colleges such as the Command and Staff College, Quetta.

Staff colleges
The following is an incomplete list of staff colleges, by continent by country:

Africa
Ghana
 Ghana Armed Forces Command And Staff College Military Academy And Training Schools, Teshie, Accra

Kenya
 Defense Staff College, Nairobi

Namibia
 Namibia Command and Staff College, Okahandja

Nigeria
 Armed Forces Command and Staff College, Jaji in Kaduna State

Uganda
 Uganda Senior Command and Staff College, Kimaka in Jinja District
 Uganda Junior Staff College, Jinja in Jinja District

The Americas

Argentina
Escuela Superior de Guerra "Teniente General Luis María Campos".

Brazil

Army
Escola de Comando e Estado-Maior do Exército
Escola de Aperfeiçoamento de Oficiais
Escola de Aperfeiçoamento de Sargentos das Armas
Escola de Instrução Especializada

Navy
Escola de Guerra Naval

Air Force
Escola de Comando e Estado Maior da Aeronáutica
Escola de Aperfeiçoamento de Oficiais da Aeronáutica

Canada
Canadian Army Command and Staff College
Canadian Forces College

United States

Air Force
Air University, HQ at Maxwell AFB, Alabama
USAF Air War College
School of Advanced Air and Space Studies
Air Command and Staff College
Squadron Officer School
Air Force Institute of Technology (Wright-Patterson AFB, Ohio)

Army
U.S. Army War College (Carlisle Barracks, PA
Command and General Staff College, Fort Leavenworth, KS
School for Command Preparation
School of Advanced Military Studies
Command and General Staff School
School for Advanced Leadership and Tactics
U.S. Army Warrant Officer Career College, Fort Rucker, AL

Navy
Naval War College in Newport, Rhode Island
College of Naval Warfare
Maritime Advanced Warfighting School
College of Naval Command and Staff
Naval Postgraduate School (Monterey, California)

Marines
Marine Corps University, Marine Corps Base, Quantico, VA
Marine Corps War College
School of Advanced Warfighting
Marine Corps Command and Staff College
Expeditionary Warfare School

Joint
Defense Acquisition University - five campuses - HQ at Fort Belvoir, Virginia
National Defense University in Washington D.C.
National War College
Industrial College of the Armed Forces
Joint Forces Staff College in Norfolk, Virginia,

Asia

Bangladesh 
Defence Services Command And Staff College, Mirpur

China
People's Liberation Army National Defense University
Nanjing PLA Army Command College
Shijiazhuang PLA Army Command College
PLA Naval Command College
PLA Air Force Command College
PLA Artillery Command College
Second Artillery Corps Command College

India

Tri-Service
 National Defence College for One Star officers and Civil servants
 Defence Services Staff College
 College of Defence Management
 Military Institute of Technology (MILIT) is a Technical Staff College

Army
 Army War College, Mhow

Navy
 Naval War College, Goa

Air force
 College of Air Warfare

Indonesia
National Armed Forces Command and General Staff College
Army Command and General Staff College

Air Force Command and General Staff College

Japan

JGSDF 

 JGSDF Staff College
 JGSDF TERDC

JMSDF 

 JMSDF Staff College

JASDF 

 Air Staff College (Japan)

Joint 
[[Joint Staff College

Jordan

Royal Jordanian Joint Command and Staff College

Kuwait
Mubarak al-Abdullah Joint Command and Staff College

Lebanon
Fouad Shehab Command and Staff College

Nepal
Army Command and Staff College Kathmandu , Nepal 
APF Command and Staff College  Kathmandu, Nepal

Pakistan
National Defence University
Command and Staff College
PAF Air War College
Pakistan Navy War College

Philippines
Armed Forces of the Philippines Command and General Staff College

Saudi Arabia
Saudi Armed Forces Command and Staff College

Singapore
Goh Keng Swee Command and Staff College

Sri Lanka

Tri-Service
General Sir John Kotelawala Defence University
Defence Services Command and Staff College

Army
Officer Career Development Centre
Army School of Logistics

Navy
Naval and Maritime Academy

Air Force
SLAF Junior Command & Staff College

Taiwan (Republic of China)
National Defense University
Army Command and Staff College
Naval Command and Staff College
Air Command and Staff College

United Arab Emirates
Armed Forces of the UAE Command and Staff College

Europe

Finland
 National Defence University (Finland)

France

 École de guerre ("War School"). Created in 1993 by the fusion of the four Écoles supérieures de guerre ("War Higher Schools"). Formerly known as  Centre des hautes études militaires  ("School of Advanced Military Studies"). Created in 1952. The students must have completed the École de guerre.
 Institut des hautes études de la défense nationale ("School of Advanced Defense Studies"). Created in 1936. The students are civilians, both civil servants and high-profile executives, but the students of the Centre des hautes études militaires also attend the Institut..
 École supérieure des officiers de réserve spécialistes d'état-major ("Reserve Staff Officers School"). Following the defeat of 1870-71 war, it was created in 1899 by a group of Reserve Officers and then officially became a staff college in 1900.

All these schools are seated in the école militaire in Paris.

Germany
 Führungsakademie der Bundeswehr, Bundeswehr Command and Staff College.
 Bundesakademie für Sicherheitspolitik, Federal Academy for Security Policy.

Italy
 Istituto di Studi Militari Marittimi, The Naval War College located within the Arsenale Marittimo in Venice.
 Istituto di Scienze Militari Aeronautiche, The Aeronautics and Defence Science Institute located in Florence.

Portugal
 Instituto de Estudos Superiores Militares ("Higher Military Studies Institute"), Portuguese Armed Forces Joint Command and Staff College. Created in 2005 by the fusion of the former three separate Army, Navy and Air Force staff colleges
 Instituto da Defesa Nacional'' ("National Defense Institute"), Ministry of Defense college for National and International Security policy, created in 1967.

Switzerland

 Armed Forces College AFC (Luzern)

United Kingdom

Defence Academy of the United Kingdom (Shrivenham)
Joint Services Command and Staff College for officers (OF2 to OF6) and Warrant Officers (Shrivenham)
JSCSC was formed by the merger in 1997 of: Staff College, Camberley (Army), Royal Naval College, Greenwich and RAF Staff College, Bracknell and the Joint Service Defence College
Royal College of Defence Studies for officers generally of colonel or brigadier rank (OF5/OF6) and civilians (London)

Oceania

Australia
The Australian Defence College (ADC) was officially opened in 1999 in Canberra. It is a Joint organisation, and comprises:
 the Centre for Defence and Strategic Studies (CDSS), Weston Creek,
 the Australian Command and Staff College (ACSC), Weston Creek, and
 the Australian Defence Force Academy (ADFA).

Prior to the establishment of the Australian Command and Staff College, middle management officer Command and Staff training was conducted at separate single Service staff colleges:
 the RAN Staff Course at the RAN Staff College at HMAS Penguin in Sydney
 the Army Command and Staff Course was conducted at the Army Command and Staff College at Fort Queenscliff in Victoria; and
 the RAAF Staff Course at the RAAF Staff College at RAAF Base Fairbairn in Canberra.

New Zealand
New Zealand Defence College

Intercontinental

NATO
NATO Defence College

See also
Command and Staff College (disambiguation)
International Association for Military Pedagogy
International Society of Military Sciences
Staff (military)
War college

References

fr:École militaire